Sphagnum imbricatum is a species of moss in the family Sphagnaceae, native to cool temperate parts of Europe and eastern North America, and found sporadically elsewhere. In the past it was used as a substitute for cotton in surgical dressings.

References

imbricatum
Flora of North America
Flora of Europe
Plants described in 1865